Johann Franz Ermels (1641 – December 1693), a German painter and engraver, a pupil of Holtzman, was born in Reilkirch. He resided at Nuremberg, and painted for the church of St. Sebald in that city a picture of the Resurrection; he was more successful, however, as a painter of landscapes, in which he imitated the style of Jan Both. He died at Nuremberg, aged 52. In the Städel Gallery at Frankfort is a Landscape by him, with figures by J. H. Roos; and in the Vienna Gallery is a Landscape with Fishermen by him. A Landscape is also in the Milan Gallery. There are by him a few etchings of landscapes, after Waterloo, Breenbergh, etc., executed with spirit and taste.

See also
 List of German painters

References
 

1641 births
1693 deaths
German landscape painters
German engravers
People from Bernkastel-Wittlich